The Senate Judiciary Subcommittee on Criminal Justice and Counterterrorism is one of six subcommittees within the Senate Judiciary Committee. It was previously known as the Subcommittee on Crime and Terrorism

Jurisdiction
 Oversight of the Department of Justice's 
- Criminal Division;
- Drug Enforcement Administration;
- Executive Office of the U.S. Attorneys; 
- Violence Against Women's Office; and 
- U.S. Marshals Office;
 Oversight of the U.S. Sentencing Commission;
 Youth violence and directly related issues;
 Federal programs under the Juvenile Justice and Delinquency Prevention Act of 1974, as Amended (including the Runaway and Homeless Youth Act), and
 Criminal justice and victim's rights legislation;
 Oversight of the Office of National Drug Control Policy;
 Oversight of Community Oriented Policing Office and Related law Enforcement grants; and
 Oversight of the U.S. Secret Service.

Members, 118th Congress

Historical subcommittee rosters

Members, 117th Congress

Members, 116th Congress

See also
U.S. House Judiciary Subcommittee on Crime, Terrorism, and Homeland Security

External links
 Subcommittee on Crime and Terrorism, official site
 Govtrack.us site on subcommittee

Judiciary Criminal Justice